In financial markets, the mid-price is the price between the best price of the sellers of the stock or commodity offer price or ask price and the best price of the buyers of the stock or commodity bid price. It can simply be defined as the average of the current bid and ask prices being quoted.

In some cases, the mid-price will be rounded up or down to the nearest "tick" (the nearest valid tradable price on the exchange system) for convenience purposes, and therefore not be the exact average.

See also 
Bid price
Ask price
Bid–offer spread

References

Financial markets